Moss Lane is a football ground in Altrincham, Greater Manchester.

Moss Lane may also refer to:
Moss Lane Cricket Ground, a former cricket ground in Moss Side, Manchester
Moss Lane, Alderley Edge, a cricket ground in Alderley Edge, Cheshire